The 1966–67 NBA season was the Bullets' 6th season in the NBA and 4th season in the city of Baltimore.

Regular season

Season standings

x – clinched playoff spot

Record vs. opponents

Game log

Awards and records
Jack Marin, NBA All-Rookie Team 1st Team

References

Washington Wizards seasons
Baltimore
Baltimore Bullets
Baltimore Bullets